Großes Häuselhorn is a mountain on the Reiter Alpe in the western part of the Berchtesgaden Alps located in Salzburg, Austria. 

Mountains of Salzburg (state)
Mountains of the Alps